Contributor may refer to:
 Author, the originator of any written work which is contributed to a publication
 Freelance writer, an author working as an independent contractor for a publication
 Contributor network, a freelance writing arrangement used by online publications
 Benefactor (law), a person who gives some form of help to benefit a person, group or organization

The Contributor may refer to:
 The Contributor (LDS magazine), a 19th-century periodical associated with The Church of Jesus Christ of Latter-day Saints
 The Contributor (street paper), a street newspaper in Nashville, Tennessee
 The Contributor (website), an American news reporting website